Krasnoarmeysky is a rural locality (a selo) in Nemetsky National District, Altai Krai, Russia. The population was 224 as of 2013. There are 2 streets.

Geography 
Krasnoarmeysky is located 22 km east of Galbshtadt (the district's administrative centre) by road. Alexandrovka is the nearest rural locality.

References 

Rural localities in Nemetsky National District